Inner suburb is a term used for a variety of suburban communities that are generally located very close to the centre of a large city (the inner city and central business district).  Their urban density is usually lower than the inner city or central business district but higher than that of the city's rural-urban fringe or exurbs.

Commonwealth of Nations 
In the Commonwealth countries (especially England and New Zealand), inner suburbs are the part of the urban area that constitutes the zone of transition, which lies outside the central business district, as well as the (traditional) working class zone. The inner suburbs of large cities are the oldest and often the most dense residential areas of the city. They tend to feature a high level of mixed-use development. Traditionally, suburbs have been home to the working class, but as manufacturing jobs have migrated to the periphery of cities, many inner suburbs have become gentrified.

United States 
In the United States, inner suburbs (sometimes known as "first-ring" suburbs) are the older, more populous communities of a metropolitan area that experienced urban sprawl before the post–World War II baby boom, thus significantly predating those of their outer suburban or exurban counterparts.

See also
 Streetcar suburb
 List of inner suburbs in the United States

References

Urban geography
Suburbs
Types of populated places